Ejiofor is a Nigerian surname. It may refer to:

Chiwetel Ejiofor (born 1977), British actor of Nigerian descent
Duke Ejiofor (born 1995), American football player of Nigerian descent
Eric Ejiofor (born 1979), Nigerian football player
Linda Ejiofor (born 1986), Nigerian actress